False dandelion is a common name for a number of plants similar to dandelions.

 Hypochaeris radicata, also known as cat's ears, the plant most commonly referred to as false dandelion
 Hypochaeris, other cat's ears related to H. radicata
 Agoseris, also known as mountain dandelions
 Crepis, also known as hawksbeards
 Hieracium, also known as hawkweeds
 Leontodon, also known as hawkbits
 Nothocalais
 Pyrrhopappus
 Scorzoneroides, also known as hawksbits
Tussilago farfara, also known as coltsfoot

See also
Mock dandelion